Joanne Peh Wei Siew (born 25 April 1983) is a Singaporean actress and host managed under The Celebrity Agency. She was named as one of the Seven Princesses of Mediacorp in 2006. She is married to Singapore-based Chinese actor Qi Yuwu.

Life and career
After winning the title of Miss Elegant and Miss Personality in Miss Singapore Universe 2002, Peh was signed on as an artiste with MediaCorp. Despite having to juggle work and her university studies at the same time, she won both the Most Popular Newcomer award and the Top 10 Most Popular Female Artistes award at the Star Awards 2004, an annual Singaporean award ceremony for TV personalities.

Peh was educated in Temasek Secondary School where she was the head prefect, and also in Victoria Junior College. After graduating with a mass communications degree from Nanyang Technological University, she continued her acting career with the station as a full-time actress.

She earned positive reviews from audiences with her performances in drama serials such as Like Father, Like Daughter, The Golden Path, The Little Nyonya and A Tale of 2 Cities. Her compelling portrayal of Yuzhu, the ill-fated girl with a heart of gold in The Little Nyonya, received rave reviews, as well as a Best Actress award nod at the Star Awards 2009.

Peh's foray into movies started in 2004, when she acted in Jack Neo's movie The Best Bet. In 2011, she proved her versatility in Raintree Pictures' highly successful festive blockbuster It's A Great Great World.

Effectively bilingual and well known for her eloquence and intelligence, Peh is also a host of variety shows and specials, including President's Star Charity 2005 and The Activist Journey, which won her the Best Info-ed Programme Host Award at Star Awards 2011, edging out veterans like Mark Lee and Bryan Wong for the award.

She won her second Best Actress at the Star Awards 2012 for her performance as a spoiled girl trying to find love in A Tale of 2 Cities. This is a feat only matched by fellow MediaCorp actress Rui En.

Having beat out veteran actresses like Zoe Tay and Fann Wong, Peh was besieged by reporters after the show, asking how she felt about her win. Peh later revealed in an interview that she broke down and cried after everyone had left.

Peh scored a rare double nomination in the Star Awards 2015 for her roles as Zhang Hui Niang in The Journey: Tumultuous Times and Assistant Superintendent of Police Leow Xin Yi in C.L.I.F. 3, for which she won the Best Supporting Actress.

A highly sought-after celebrity for commercial endorsements, Peh has lent her face to numerous immensely successful campaigns, including Lux and Jetstar. 

Peh received the All-Time Favourite Artiste Award at the Star Awards 2017 after winning the Top 10 Most Popular Female Artistes award from 2005 to 2006 and 2008 to 2016.

Personal life
Peh was in a high-profile relationship with radio deejay and celebrity Bobby Tonelli for four years, after they met on the set of The Little Nyonya. The couple regularly appeared together on television shows and commercials before their split.

In April 2013, Peh began dating Chinese actor Qi Yuwu. They were married in a private ceremony on 9 September 2014 at the Mövenpick Heritage Hotel Sentosa. On 28 January 2015, the couple announced that they were expecting their first child. On 7 August 2015, she gave birth to a baby girl. On 21 April 2017, she gave birth to her second child, a boy.

Peh has an official fan club called "Jollity Club" which has been running since 2005.

Filmography

Television series

Film

Variety show host

Awards and nominations

References

External links

 
 Joanne Peh's Profile on Toggle

1983 births
Living people
Nanyang Technological University alumni
Singaporean people of Hokkien descent
Singaporean television actresses
Singaporean film actresses
Singaporean television personalities
21st-century Singaporean actresses
Victoria Junior College alumni